Pladaroxylon is a genus of trees in the groundsel tribe within the sunflower family.

The only known species is Pladaroxylon leucadendron, native to the island of St. Helena in the South Atlantic. Common name is he cabbage-tree.

See also
 Flora of St Helena
 She cabbage-tree

References

External links

Senecioneae
Monotypic Asteraceae genera
Flora of Saint Helena
Critically endangered plants